Viswanathan Ratnam (1 August 1932 – 23 May 2020) was an Indian judge and politician. He served as Chief Justice of the Himachal Pradesh High Court and Governor of Himachal Pradesh.

Life and career
Ratnam was born in 1932. He passed B.Sc., LL.B. and was enrolled as an Advocate on 25 July 1955. He started practice on Civil and Labour matters in the Madras High Court. Ratnam became the member of the Executive Committee of the Tamil Nadu Legal Aid Board. On 25 January 1979, he was appointed permanent Judge of Madras High Court. Since 15 November 1992, he also took charge of the Acting Chief Justice of Madras High Court. Justice Ratnam was elevated in the post of Chief Justice of Himachal Pradesh High Court on 29 January 1994 and retired on 1 August 1994 from the post. He also took charge in the post of Governor of Himachal Pradesh for 19 days.

Ratnam died from COVID-19 on 23 May 2020, at the age of 87.

References

1932 births
2020 deaths
Indian judges
Governors of Himachal Pradesh
Chief Justices of the Himachal Pradesh High Court
Judges of the Madras High Court
20th-century Indian judges
21st-century Indian judges
Deaths from the COVID-19 pandemic in India